In quantum mechanics, for systems where the total number of particles may not be preserved, the number operator is the observable that counts the number of particles.

The number operator acts on Fock space. Let

be a Fock state, composed of single-particle states  drawn from a basis of the underlying Hilbert space of the Fock space. Given the corresponding creation and annihilation operators  and  we define the number operator by

and we have

where  is the number of particles in state . The above equality can be proven by noting that

then

See also
Harmonic oscillator
Quantum harmonic oscillator
Second quantization
Quantum field theory
Thermodynamics
Fermion number operator
(-1)F

References
 
 Second quantization notes by Fradkin

Quantum mechanics